"The Ghost of You" is the fourth and final single and sixth track from My Chemical Romance's second studio album, Three Cheers for Sweet Revenge. "The Ghost of You" was released to radio on September 27, 2005. The song deals with the fear of loss. The song's title is an allusion to an ad from Watchmen, reading "Oh, how the ghost of you clings". The ad itself was an allusion to the song, "These Foolish Things". The song's lyrics deal with losing a loved one.

Music video

The music video was shot over two days in Malibu, California, and cost just over US $1,000,000 to make. Marc Webb directed the video. In an interview with Fuse, My Chemical Romance said "We shot a movie and just edited it to be a video. It's like if you put 'Helena' and 'I'm Not Okay (I Promise)' together to make one long music video, it still would top that." It closely parallels the Omaha invasion scene from the movie Saving Private Ryan. Most of the video takes place at a USO dance where the band is performing, but, often switches over to a D-Day scene, in which the band members play as United States soldiers in fierce combat. (At the dance, one soldier's uniform bears the 101st Airborne Division "Screamin' Eagles" patch, however the 101st Airborne Division was not involved in beach landings, but were parachuted behind enemy lines on D-Day, suggesting that several units were present at the ball. 1st Infantry Division and Ninth Air Force patches can also be seen.) 

The video takes an emotional turn when bassist Mikey Way is shot and killed by Axis fire despite the medic's (played by Ray Toro) attempts to save him, adding emphasis to the aspects of loss in the song. This is foreshadowed in a bar scene where vocalist Gerard Way, his brother, appears to be reassuring him that he will be alright, and that there is no reason to be afraid. He is seen wearing a 1st Infantry Division patch in the video. Mikey "dies" with his eyes open. Gerard is restrained by his squadmates/band members as he sees his brother die, and is seen screaming (although there is no sound other than the song) as he tries to run to him. The 1st Infantry Division, the "Big Red One", were among the first wave on Omaha Beach, June 6, 1944. In Life on the Murder Scene, Ray is told to talk to Mikey to look like he is trying to save him. Obligingly, he shouts "Mikey! You're dead! [How do you feel!?]"

As of September 2022, the song has 110 million views on YouTube.

Track listing
All songs written by My Chemical Romance.
US promotional CD

UK promotional CD

UK 7" vinyl

UK CD1

UK CD2

iTunes EP

Charts

Release history

References

Rock ballads
2000s ballads
2004 songs
2005 singles
My Chemical Romance songs
Music videos directed by Marc Webb
Songs written by Gerard Way
Song recordings produced by Howard Benson
Reprise Records singles